Clavus particolor is a species of sea snail, a marine gastropoda mollusk in the family Drilliidae.

Description
The length of the shell attains 14.8 mm.

Distribution
This marine species occurs off the Philippines.

Original description
 Stahlschmidt P., Poppe G.T. & Tagaro S.P. (2018). Descriptions of remarkable new turrid species from the Philippines. Visaya. 5(1): 5-64. page(s): 17, pl. 12 figs 1-3.

References

External links
 Worms Link

particolor
Gastropods described in 2018